tRNA pseudouridine65 synthase (TruC, YqcB) is an enzyme with systematic name tRNA-uridine65 uracil mutase. This enzyme catalyses the following chemical reaction

 tRNA uridine65  tRNA pseudouridine65

TruC specifically modifies uridines at positions 65 in tRNA.

References

External links 
 

EC 5.4.99